Nester House may refer to:

 Nester House (Troy, Indiana), listed on the NRHP in Indiana
 Nester House (Geneva, New York), listed on the NRHP in New York